Wenche  is a popular female first name in Norway. The name is also spelled Venke, Wenke, Venche, Wencke, Vence or Vencke.

Notable people with the name include:
Wenche Elizabeth Arntzen (born 1959), Norwegian lawyer and judge 
Wenche Foss (1917–2011), Norwegian actress
Wenche Klouman (1918–2009), Norwegian actress
Venke Knutson (born 1978), Norwegian singer
Wenche Myhre (born 1947), Norwegian singer
Wenche Selmer (1920–1998), Norwegian architect

Feminine given names
Norwegian feminine given names